Tetratricopeptide repeat domain 21B is a protein that in humans is encoded by the TTC21B gene.

Function

This gene encodes a member of TTC21 family, containing several tetratricopeptide repeat (TPR) domains. This protein is localized to the cilium axoneme, and may play a role in retrograde intraflagellar transport in cilia. Mutations in this gene are associated with various ciliopathies, nephronophthisis 12, and asphyxiating thoracic dystrophy 4. [provided by RefSeq, Oct 2011].

References

Further reading